SAIL, the Stanford Artificial Intelligence Language, was developed by Dan Swinehart and Bob Sproull of the Stanford AI Lab in 1970.  It was originally a large ALGOL 60-like language for the PDP-10 and DECSYSTEM-20.

SAIL's main feature is a symbolic data system based upon an associative store (based on the LEAP system of Jerry Feldman and Paul Rovner). Items may be stored as unordered sets or as associations (triples).  Other features include processes, events and interrupts, contexts, backtracking and record garbage collection.  It also has block-structured macros, a coroutining facility and some new data types intended for building search trees and association lists.

A number of interesting software systems were coded in SAIL, including some early versions of FTP and TeX, a document formatting system called PUB, and BRIGHT, a clinical database project sponsored by the National Institutes of Health.

In 1978, there were half a dozen different operating systems for the PDP-10: ITS (MIT), WAITS (Stanford), TOPS-10 (DEC), CMU TOPS-10 (Carnegie Mellon), TENEX (BBN), Tymcom-X (Tymshare), and TOPS-20 (DEC, based on TENEX).

SAIL was ported from WAITS to ITS so that MIT researchers could make use of software developed at Stanford University. Every port usually required the rewriting of I/O code in each application.

A machine-independent version of SAIL called MAINSAIL was developed in the late 1970s and was used to develop many eCAD design tools during the 1980s.  MAINSAIL was easily portable to new processors and operating systems, and was still in limited use .

See also
Stanford Extended ASCII (SEASCII)

References

Further reading

External links
Documentation for MAINSAIL.
A SAIL Tutorial from the DECUS PDP-10 library tapes
Stanford Artificial Intelligence Lab Memo AIM-289/SAILON 57.4: SAIL Manual August 1976

Algol programming language family